Christian Didier Chin (born 23 August 2000) is a professional Malaysian tennis player with a career high ITF junior combined ranking of 44.

Chin has a career high ATP doubles ranking of 1498 achieved on 6 November 2017.

Chin has a career high ITF junior combined ranking of 44 achieved on 1 January 2018.

Chin has represented Malaysia at the Davis Cup, where he has a win-loss record of 2–1.

External links

2000 births
Living people
Malaysian male tennis players
Malaysian people of Taiwanese descent
People from Sabah
21st-century Malaysian people